Poplar Ridge, New York is a hamlet in Cayuga County, New York, United States, in the town of Venice, New York.  It holds the Jethro Wood House, a National Historic Landmark. The Vernon Center Green Historic District was listed on the National Register of Historic Places in 1985.

References

Hamlets in Cayuga County, New York
Hamlets in New York (state)